Pratama Arhan Alif Rifai (born 21 December 2001) is an Indonesian professional footballer who plays as a left-back for J2 League club Tokyo Verdy and the Indonesia national team. He is most known for his powerful throw-ins and free kicks. Arhan was also a nominee of the AFC's 11 players to watch in 2023.

Club career

PSIS Semarang 
Pratama Arhan made his first-team debut for PSIS Semarang in the 2021 Menpora Cup, in which he played 90 minutes in all of his team's four matches in the tournament that preluded the 2021 Liga 1 season. He scored two goals in that competition, one of them was a free-kick that was among the best goals in the tournament. He also won the tourney's Best Young Player award. Arhan made his league debut on 4 September 2021 in a match against Persela Lamongan.

Tokyo Verdy 

On 16 February 2022, Arhan is officially signed with J2 League club, Tokyo Verdy for a two-year contract with free transfer fee.

Arhan made his league debut on 6 July 2022, against Tochigi SC in a 1–0 victory.

On 19 January 2023, Arhan renewal contract for Tokyo Verdy ahead of 2023 season.

International career
Arhan debuted for the Indonesia U-19 team when it faced the Bulgaria U-19 in a friendly on 5 September 2020 in Croatia. He captained the same team during another friendly match in the two-month Croatia training, this time Indonesia drew with the North Macedonia U-19 team. He received a call to join the senior Indonesian national football team in May 2021.

He earned his first senior cap in a 25 May 2021 friendly match in Dubai against Afghanistan. On 19 December 2021, Arhan scored his debut goal for the national team in a 2020 AFF Championship game against Malaysia in Kallang. and he also became man of the match in that match. On 25 December 2021, Arhan scored again against Singapore in the second leg of semi-final in a 4-2 victory after extra-time. He was awarded the "Young Player of the Tournament" for the tournament.

On 24 September 2022, Arhan made two assists, with one of them through a long throw-in, in a friendly match against Curaçao in a 3–2 win. Arhan was called up for his two AFF Championship tournament by Shin Tae-yong.

On 2 January 2023, Arhan give another assists from long thrown-in to Dendy Sulistyawan in Indonesia's 0–2 away win against Philippines at Rizal Memorial Stadium.

Career statistics

Club
.

Notes

International

International goals
International senior goals

Honours 
Indonesia
 AFF Championship runner-up: 2020

Individual
 Menpora Cup Best Young Player: 2021
 Menpora Cup Best Eleven: 2021
 AFF Championship Young Player of the Tournament: 2020

References

External links 
 Pratama Arhan at Liga Indonesia
 

2001 births
Living people
Indonesian footballers
Indonesia youth international footballers
Indonesia international footballers
Liga 1 (Indonesia) players
PSIS Semarang players
People from Blora Regency
Association football defenders
J2 League players
Indonesian expatriate footballers
Indonesian expatriate sportspeople in Japan
Tokyo Verdy players
Expatriate footballers in Japan
Sportspeople from Central Java